Santiago Miguel "Diego" Cavanagh y Hearne (May 16, 1905 – July 30, 1977) was an Argentine polo player at the 1936 Summer Olympics.

He was a squad member of the Argentine polo team, which won the gold medal. He did not compete in the Berlin tournament, but was a reserve player.

His younger brother Roberto Cavanagh was also a squad member. He played in both games.

External links
Argentine polo team at the Olympics 

1905 births
1977 deaths
Argentine polo players
Olympic polo players of Argentina
Polo players at the 1936 Summer Olympics
Olympic medalists in polo